Faux or Faulx is a surname, ultimately from Latin fagus ("beech"). The English surname is of Flemish origin. 

The Belgian "Faux" and its variants could derive from the adjective faux (Middle French: faulx), "false",  but they are most likely toponymic surnames. "Faux" is a variant of "Faulx", and "Faut" is another variant from either one of them. Cognates and variants include "Defau", "Defaut", "Defauw", "Defauwe" and "De Fauwe". The Belgian surnames could refer to Faux in Court-Saint-Étienne, Wallonia, or Faulx-les-Tombes, also in Wallonia. The etymology is ultimately from Latin fagus, via Old French fou, fau (Walloon: faw), "beech". The etymology could also be from Germanic *falisa, "cliff".

In France the surname is present in the North East, but it is also popular in the South West. Surnames from the latter place likely derive from another place called "Faux" (probably Faux in Dordogne). The etymology is always from Latin fagus.

People with the surname Faux

 Catherine Faux, British triathlete
 Jean Marie Faux, SJ, Jesuit author and professor from Brussels, former general secretary of the Belgian MRAX
 Jeff Faux, principal founder and first president (1986–2002) of the Economic Policy Institute

People with the surname Faut
 Corinne Faut, Belgian general
 Ernest Faut, Flemish painter

References

Surnames of Belgian origin
Surnames of French origin
Toponymic surnames